The 2022–2023 The Ocean Race is the 14th edition of the round-the-world The Ocean Race. It started in Alicante, Spain.

The Covid-19 pandemic forced the organisers to delay the world race planned for 2021-2022. The start was initially in October 2022, but it was postponed.

Participants
A total of 11 boats are participating in the race, 5 in the IMOCA 60 class and 6 in the Volvo Ocean 65 class.
IMOCA

VO65

Route
The route and stopover dates for the 2023 edition have been announced in December 2021. The VO65 class boats only participate in the first and the last two legs, for "The Ocean Race VO65 Sprint Cup".

Results

Overall standings

In-port series

 DNF - Did not finish

References

External links

The Ocean Race
2023 in sailing
2023 in Spanish sport
2023 in Cape Verdean sport
2023 in South African sport
2023 in Brazilian sport
2023 in American sports
2023 in Danish sport
2023 in Dutch sport
2023 in German sport
2023 in Italian sport